The term Abgal refers to the Seven Sages of Ancient Mesopotamian tradition.

Abgal may also refer to:

 Abgal (god), a Palmyrene deity

See also
 Abgaal, a Somali clan
 Abigail (disambiguation)